Hugh Martyn Williams, commonly known as Hugh Williams, (born 7 December 1946) is a British chartered accountant, author and politician. He is the son of the former North Cornwall Conservative MP, Alfred Martyn Williams (1898–1986). He was a senior partner of HM Williams Chartered Accountants until 2014 and National Treasurer  of the United Kingdom Independence Party.

Business life 
Williams was educated at Eton College and qualified as a Chartered Accountant in 1970. He set up his own accountancy practice in 1973, first at a small farm on Dartmoor, moving to Plympton in 2001.

He is also the owner of St. Edward's Press, an independent publisher.

Politics 
A former Conservative supporter, in 2003, Williams became a member of UKIP. In 2004, he met Marta Andreasen and subsequently (through St. Edward's press) published Brussels Laid Bare.

He stood as a UKIP candidate in the 2005 and 2010 general elections in the Devon South West constituency.

He was elected to UKIP's National Executive Committee in 2010 where he was subsequently appointed as UKIP's Deputy National Treasurer. After the 2014 European elections he succeeded as National Treasurer.

Williams is a former member of the Dartmoor National Park Authority.

Controversy
Williams' self-published history book From Ur to Us, Everything you Need to Know about History attracted strong criticism for a number of claims such as Winston Churchill admiring Hitler and the German invasion of Poland being provoked by Polish aggression.

Publications

Personal life 
Williams is married with five children and five grandchildren. He is a lifelong supporter of Plymouth Argyle F.C.

External links 
 St. Edward's Press
 HM Williams Chartered Accountants

References 

Living people
1946 births
People educated at Eton College
British accountants
Writers from Plymouth, Devon
Businesspeople from Plymouth, Devon
UK Independence Party parliamentary candidates
Politicians from Plymouth, Devon